Debe High School is a co-educational high school first established in 2000 which offers forms 1-6. It is situated in south Trinidad in Debe. The school's motto is Şeize the Day.

Campus 
The school is surrounded by a former sugar cane field opposite the Fun Splash water park. Located in Debe, it is a quiet school of a population of about 568 students and approximately 40 teachers. Though situated outside the urban area, Debe Secondary has been highly noted for its discipline and high standards of education. The UWI is being built near the school.

House system 
The school has four houses: Scarlet Ibis (Red), Blue Jays (Blue), Humming Birds (Green), and Kiskidee (Yellow). The house system is mostly irrelevant to daily school life, however the house systems come into play during annual sporting events.

School layout 
The school has 8 blocks.
The main student building, which has 2 floors. The lower level hosts the Forms 1 and 2 classes, as well as the Physical Education room. The upper floor hosts form 3 and 4 classrooms, in addition to the Business Lab.
Administrative building - which has the staff room, Principal's Office, Vice Principal's Office, Safety Office, and Guidance Office
Form 6 Block. 5S is also housed on that block.
Student Centre - Which includes a library, reading room, computer (IT) lab, and AV room.
Toilet Block - also houses the school cleaning staff
Lab Block - houses three labs (Biology, Chemistry, and Physics) and 3H
Form 5 Prefab, which hosts classes 5D and H.
Subject block-which holds the Art room, Music room, dance room and Technology Education Lab.

There is also a Café and main Assembly Hall

School composition 
Students
Safety Officers - monitor school to ensure the safety of the students, removing and checking for any hazards on the school compound
Guidance Officer - helps students with problems and career guidance
Lab technicians
School prefects - students chosen by Deans to keep order
Librarians
Teachers
Guards
Cleaners
Principal and Vice Principal
Deans
Cafeteria Staff - cooks and sellers
Farm attendants

Admission to college 

Admission to college is determined by performance on an examination.

The current examination is the Secondary Entrance Assessment or SEA. The Division of Educational Research and Evaluation (DERE) and Division of Curriculum Development of the Trinidad & Tobago Ministry of Education describe the 3-hour-10-minute-long SEA as "a mechanism that facilitates placement of students in secondary schools in Trinidad and Tobago". The SEA comprises three papers that must be attempted by all candidates: Creative Writing, Mathematics and Language Arts. The assessment covers the national curriculum for primary-level education for Standards Three to Five, the final three years of elementary instruction.

Debe High tends to be an institution of third choice of the five prospective institutions each examinee is required to list in preferential order of interest prior to the exam. The five preferences are drawn from the totality of secondary institutions nationwide. A candidate is unlikely to gain admission to the College but for performance consistent with the highest examination percentiles.

The precursor to the SEA was the Common Entrance Examination or CEE. The CEE mirrored the SEA in several significant respects.

Students can also be transferred into the school after an entrance exam.

Extracurricular activities 
Due to the Covid-19 pandemic and the slow return to full physical schooling, many of the school's clubs have been put on hold, however a few have restarted and others will be back online. 
Track and Field hosted on Tuesday and Wednesday by the PE teacher Mr. Cummings after school.
Photography Club hosted on Fridays.

Uniform 
Girls are required to wear a navy blue skirt 2 inches below the knee. Black shoes, black socks, a white shirt blouse with waist band attached that is fitted over the skirt and a blue, silver, and red tie complete the uniform.

Boys are required to wear navy blue pants, white shirt tucked in the pants, black belt, and black shoes and black socks with a blue, silver, and red tie.

Subjects 

The school offers a wide variety of subject choices.
Offer to form 1-3 are
Drama, Art, Maths
English, Spanish, Physical Education
Music, Literature, Social Studies, I.T., Dance, Science (Biology, Chemistry, Physics)

Offered for 4–5 forms. Every child is required to choose 5 subjects out of 8 (Maths, English, and Literature are compulsory) to do in C.X.C. exams.

Choices

Computer Science
Art
Geography
Physics
Agricultural Science
Principles of Accounts
Spanish
Social Studies
Biology
Office Procedures
Principle of Business
History
Chemistry
Food and Nutrition

Cape is now done at the school. They offer-
Biology
Chemistry
Physics
Mathematics
Geography
Environmental Science
History
Literature
MOB
Accounts
Economics
Sociology

Education 

Students of the College pursue a course of instruction leading to external examination under the authority of the Caribbean Examinations Council (CXC). After five years at the College - and in selected instances, four years - students sit the Caribbean Secondary Education Certificate (CSEC) examination in various fields of study.

The CXC was established in 1972 by agreement of regional governments seeking an effective and functional model through which to provide and assess a secondary education curriculum reflective of, and sensitive to Caribbean priorities and reality. As a body, the Council has an operative relationship with the University of the West Indies and the governments of fifteen (15) participating territories aside from that of the Republic of Trinidad & Tobago.

The CSEC examinations are the accepted and internationally recognised equivalent of the GCE or General Certificate of Education Ordinary Level examinations they replaced. For decades, examinees at Pres took GCEs set by the University of Cambridge Local Examinations Syndicate, now known as University of Cambridge International Examinations. However, a preceding generation of students took a version of Cambridge examination known as the Cambridge School Certificate, a precursor of contemporary GCE O'levels.

Students at the College first sat CXC exams (CSEC) in 1979. At that time, the subjects available for examination under CXC existed in limited number. The first group of examinees submitted to examination in the areas of English Language (English A), Mathematics and Geography, while also taking Cambridge GCEs in these three subjects and other subjects.

Gradually, the range of subjects offered by the Caribbean Examinations Council expanded until CSEC exams came to replace the traditional Cambridge GCE exams completely.

In everyday parlance, CSEC examinations are commonly referred to as CXCs because from 1979 to 1998 they constituted the only form of examination offered by the Caribbean Examinations Council. However, the Council later developed the Caribbean Advanced Proficiency Examinations (CAPE) examinations to replace the British Advanced level or A-level exams - as they are known throughout the British Commonwealth. The Council's rationale for the change was predicated on the same basis as that supporting the curricular adjustments leading to the introduction of the CSEC.

CAPE examinations are taken by students who have completed their standard secondary education (the CSEC) and who seek to continue their studies, beyond the minimum age for completion of compulsory education.

Students who wish to sit for the CAPE usually possess CSEC or an equivalent certification. The CAPE is the globally recognised equivalent of British A-levels. Students at the College formerly submitted to GCE Advanced Levels through the University of Cambridge Local Examinations Syndicate.

References

http://www.tntisland.com/schoolssec-tdad.html#sstdadd
https://web.archive.org/web/20080609114620/http://www.guardian.co.tt/archives/2004-10-14/sports1.html

Educational institutions established in 2000
Schools in Trinidad and Tobago
2000 establishments in Trinidad and Tobago